Parastenopa is a genus of fruit flies in the family Tephritidae. There are about 10 described species in Parastenopa.

Species
These 10 species belong to the genus Parastenopa:
 Parastenopa anastrephoides (Curran, 1934) i c g
 Parastenopa brasiliensis (Lima, 1933) i c g
 Parastenopa carinata Hendel, 1914 i c g
 Parastenopa elegans (Blanchard, 1929) i c g
 Parastenopa fallax (Johnson, 1919) i c g
 Parastenopa guttata Aczel, 1956 i c g
 Parastenopa limata (Coquillett, 1899) i c g b
 Parastenopa marcetiae Bezzi & Tavares, 1916 i c g
 Parastenopa montana Aczel, 1956 i c g
 Parastenopa ogloblini (Blanchard, 1929) i c g
Data sources: i = ITIS, c = Catalogue of Life, g = GBIF, b = Bugguide.net

References

Further reading

External links

 

Trypetinae
Tephritidae genera